A ban from Major League Baseball is a form of punishment levied by the Office of the Commissioner of Major League Baseball (MLB) against a player, manager, executive, or other person connected with the league as a denunciation of some action that person committed that violated or tarnished the integrity of the game. A banned person is forbidden from employment with MLB or its affiliated minor leagues, and is forbidden from other professional involvement with MLB such as acting as a sports agent for an MLB player. Since 1991, all banned people – whether living or deceased – have been barred from induction to the Baseball Hall of Fame.

Major League Baseball has maintained an official list of "permanently ineligible" people since Kenesaw Mountain Landis was installed as the first Commissioner of Baseball in 1920. Although the majority of banned persons were banned after the establishment of the Commissioner's office, some were formally banned prior to that time while a few others were informally "blacklisted" by the Major League clubs. Most persons who have been banned (including many who have been reinstated) were banned due to association with gambling or otherwise conspiring to fix the outcomes of games; others have been banned for a multitude of reasons including illegal activities off the field, violating some term of their playing contract, or making disparaging remarks that brought the game into disrepute.

History

Prior to 1920, players were banned by the decision of a committee. There were 14 players banned from 1865 to 1920; of those, 12 were banned for association with gambling or attempting to fix games, one was banned for violating the reserve clause, and one was banned for making disparaging remarks.

In 1920, team owners established the Office of the Commissioner of Baseball, ostensibly to keep the players in line and out of corruption's way. Kenesaw Mountain Landis, a federal judge, was the owners' ideal candidate for the job and was given unlimited power over the game, including the authority to ban people from the game. 

He banned many players and various others, often for seemingly small offenses, and at times almost indiscriminately. In his 24 years as commissioner, Landis banned more people than all of his successors combined. The last person banned by Landis to remain alive was William D. Cox, who died in 1989.

As of 2021, no one has died while still ineligible after being banned by one of Landis' successors. In 1991, the National Baseball Hall of Fame and Museum voted to bar banned players from induction. Rose's banishment remains among the most bitterly debated of any imposed after Landis' tenure. While Rose eventually admitted to betting on his team (which under the rules then and now in force are grounds for permanent ineligibility), his supporters argue that a lifetime ban is unjust due to a lack of conclusive evidence that his gambling directly affected the outcome of any games, and also due to modern society's more relaxed attitude towards gambling.

By the 21st century, the use of performance enhancing drugs had replaced the possible influence of gambling as the greatest perceived threat to the integrity of the game.

Subsequently, both the Commissioner of Baseball and the Major League Baseball Players Association came under intense pressure from fans, owners, current and former players, team officials, and the United States Congress to take decisive action against PED use in baseball. In 2005, as a result of the findings of the Mitchell Report, the owners and the MLBPA reached a new Basic Agreement which stipulated that multiple violations of the overhauled Major League Baseball drug policy would result in a lifetime ban.

Punishment

Prohibited 
A person who has been banned from Major League Baseball is barred from:

employment with MLB, one of its affiliated minor leagues, or any Major League or Minor League Club, whether as a player, coach, or manager, or in the front office;
acting as a sports agent for any Major League or Minor League player, coach, or manager;
maintaining business ties with MLB or with any Major League or Minor League Club;
The exception to this is that MLB or any Major League or Minor League Club may invite banned persons to participate in events where said participation will not put the banned person(s) in a position where they could influence play (for example, an appearance at a public recognition ceremony). All such participation is subject to the approval of the Commissioner, who has the authority to deal with such requests on a case-by-case basis. The exact privileges that will be afforded for each special event is determined by the Commissioner – invariably, access to the clubhouse and related facilities by banned people will not be permitted. (This exception has evolved over the decades following the banishment of MLB's all-time hit leader Pete Rose in 1989. In the early years of Rose's ban, dispensations for special events were rarely granted. In recent years, especially since incumbent Rob Manfred's assumption of the office, special event dispensations for Rose have become considerably more frequent.)
induction to the Hall of Fame, whether the person is living or deceased.
This prohibition is not the result of any MLB rule or policy (since the Hall of Fame falls outside the jurisdiction of the Commissioner's Office), but is a policy enforced by the Hall itself. Prior to the late 1980s, the Baseball Writers' Association of America and Veterans Committee each had an unwritten rule excluding banned people from consideration for election to the Hall. (The banishment of Rose necessitated a formalization of this policy prior to 1991 when Rose would otherwise have become eligible for election to the Hall.) Although Commissioner Bart Giamatti had stated at the time of Rose's ban that their agreement did not directly affect his Hall eligibility, he died before he could elaborate on the issue. Nevertheless, the Hall soon voted to formally exclude banned people from induction, a position that was endorsed by Giamatti's successor Fay Vincent. On the other hand, in his most recent statement affirming Rose's ban, Commissioner Manfred stated "It is not a part of my authority... to make any determination concerning Mr. Rose's eligibility as a candidate for election to the (Hall of Fame)... in my view, the considerations that should drive a decision on whether an individual should be allowed to work in Baseball are not the same as those that should drive a decision on Hall of Fame eligibility... any debate over Mr. Rose's eligibility for the Hall of Fame is one that must take place in a different forum." Notwithstanding Manfred's statements, the Hall of Fame's policies remain unchanged.) How a ban imposed on an existing member of the Hall of Fame would affect that member in light of official Hall policy is not clear. Prior to Rose's ban, two members of the Hall of Fame (Willie Mays and Mickey Mantle) were banned from baseball for associating with licensed casinos (with duties unrelated to sports betting). The Hall took no action as a result of these bans, which in any event were extremely controversial while they were in effect and rescinded long before the Hall policy was formalized. Since that time, Roberto Alomar has become the first Hall member to be banned from Major League Baseball. , Alomar remains enshrined in the Hall.

Terms such as "lifetime ban" and "permanent ban" are misnomers, as a banned person may be reinstated (i.e., have the ban removed) whether by the decision of the Commissioner of Major League Baseball or (in the case of players banned since the establishment of the Major League Baseball Players Association) following an appeal by the MLBPA on behalf of a banned player to an independent arbitrator empowered to hear and adjudicate such appeals. Furthermore, in the case of Hall of Fame induction, bans have typically extended beyond a person's lifetime.

Non-prohibited 
Among the activities that a banned person is not precluded from participating (as of 2016) in include:

Participating in baseball leagues that are not affiliated with MLB;
This was not the case for players banned by Commissioner Kenesaw Mountain Landis. Early on in Landis' tenure, the new Commissioner made it clear that anyone who knowingly played with or against any banned player would himself be banned from MLB for life. Landis' tenure was before the advent of the modern Minor League farm system, meaning that unlike his successors he lacked any formal jurisdiction outside the then-16 MLB clubs, moreover as Commissioner Landis repeatedly blocked the establishment of what would come to be known as the minor league system. Nevertheless, while Landis took actions which appeared to recognize and/or protect the independence of other leagues his uncompromising stance against banned players compelled every other professional league to honor MLB bans, and in effect gave Commissioner Landis the de facto power to completely exclude personnel from the game. However, some players banned by Landis are believed to have continued playing under assumed identities at the minor league or semi-professional level.
Working for employers that themselves have business relationships with MLB and/or with a Major League or Minor League Club, provided the relationship does not result in a direct association with any Major League or Minor League Club and/or put the banned person in a position to influence baseball operations (for example, working for a national broadcaster that owns rights to MLB games);
During Landis' tenure, it was universally known that MLB would have immediately severed any relationship with an entity that employed personnel banned by MLB, and (at least until very recently), most such organizations have been extremely reluctant to offer employment to banned people for fear of generating negative publicity and/or out of concern that such employment might endanger their relationship with MLB. (MLB policy was articulated by Commissioner Manfred when, in reference to Rose, he stated "Major League Rules... do not cover relationships with third parties who do business with Major League Baseball. Any future relationship Mr. Rose may contemplate with any such party is a matter between him and the party, unless it involves any association with a Major League Club...")
Working for an MLB or MiLB ownership group in an arrangement that keeps the banned person outside the organizational structure and uninvolved in the baseball operations of the Major League or Minor League Club in question (for example, working as an in-studio analyst for a broadcaster that owns the Major League club it holds the broadcasting rights for would be permitted);
Entering any Major League or Minor League ballpark in the capacity of (and with only the privileges of) an ordinary spectator. However, MLB rules define the granting free entry to a game or any other event with paid admission as a "business relationship" that, subject to Commissioner-granted dispensations for special events as described above, would not be permitted. This means, among other things, that a banned person must normally purchase a ticket (or have one given to him by a party not affiliated with MLB) in order to attend a game.

List of banned people
Bans that are in effect and/or that were still in effect at the time of the banned person's death are denoted in bold. Living persons are denoted in italics. No banned person has ever been posthumously re-instated by Major League Baseball.

Pre-1920 
These players were banned from baseball prior to the creation of the office of Commissioner of Baseball.
 Thomas Devyr, Ed Duffy and William Wansley of the New York Mutuals were banned in 1865 for associating with known gamblers. Devyr was reinstated later that year, and Duffy and Wansley were reinstated in 1870.
 John Radcliff of the Chicago White Stockings was banned in 1874 after attempting to bribe umpire Billy McLean with $175 to help the White Stockings win. He was blacklisted but ultimately was reinstated and played the next year.
George Bechtel of the Louisville Grays was banned in 1876 for conspiring with his teammates to intentionally lose a game for $500, equal to $ today.  He was never reinstated.
Jim Devlin, George Hall, Al Nichols and Bill Craver of the Louisville Grays were banned in 1877 for conspiring to throw two games in the Louisville Grays scandal. No evidence was ever found to suggest that Craver actually had anything to do with the conspiracy, but he refused to cooperate with the investigators. The four banned players were never reinstated.
 Oscar Walker was banned in 1877 for "contract jumping" by signing a contract to play for another team while still under contract to the team he left. This was 98 years prior to the advent of free agency in sports; Walker was reinstated in 1879.

 Lip Pike's play for Worcester in 1881 was so poor as to arouse suspicions, and Pike found himself the first professional player banned from the National League that September. He was added to the National League blacklist in 1881, and reinstated in 1883.
 Umpire and former outfielder Richard "Dick" Higham was banned in 1882 for conspiring to help throw a Detroit Wolverines game after Detroit's owner hired a private investigator to check out Higham's background and found that he was an associate of a known gambler. To date, Higham is the only umpire banned for life.
 Joseph Marie Creamer III, New York Giants team physician, was banned in 1908 for attempting to bribe umpire Bill Klem $2,500 (equal to $ today) to conspire against the Chicago Cubs during a playoff game against the Giants.
Jack O'Connor and Harry Howell, manager and coach of the St. Louis Browns, were banned in 1910 for attempting to fix the outcome of the 1910 American League batting title for Cleveland Indians player Nap Lajoie against Ty Cobb.
Horace Fogel, Philadelphia Phillies owner, was banned in 1912 for publicly asserting that the umpires favored the New York Giants and were making unfair calls against his team.

Unofficial-turned-official bans 
These players were unofficially banned from baseball before the creation of the office of Commissioner of Baseball. They later had their bans made official by baseball's first Commissioner, Kenesaw Mountain Landis.
Joe Harris of the Cleveland Indians was banned in 1920 after he chose to play for an independent team rather than the Indians. Harris was reinstated by Landis in 1922 due to, in part, his service during World War I.

Hal Chase of the New York Giants was banned in 1921 for consorting with gamblers and betting on his teams, among other disallowed practices. Chase had previously been accused of fixing games as early as 1910 and was reportedly passed over for managerial opportunities due to the allegations. In 1918, Reds manager Christy Mathewson suspended Chase mid-season for fixing games, and John McGraw persuaded Mathewson to trade him to the Giants. At the end of the 1919 season, National League president John Heydler found evidence that Chase bribed players on other teams. Heydler forced his immediate release, and no other National League team would sign him. Since no American League team would sign him either, Chase was blackballed from the major leagues. Landis' declaration after the Black Sox trial that no one who bet on baseball would ever be allowed to play is recognized as formalizing the ban.
Heinie Zimmerman of the New York Giants was banned in 1921 for encouraging his teammates to fix games. He had been benched by McGraw and later sent home during the 1919 season and had been informally banned from the majors. During the 1917 World Series, he chased the winning run across the plate and found himself having to deny having helped throw the Series. Despite some of these allegations, McGraw would not turn him in, not wanting to be the one responsible for having one of his players banned for life and suspended indefinitely. Later, McGraw testified in court that Zimmerman conspired to fix games. As with Chase, Landis' declaration after the Black Sox trial is also seen as formalizing Zimmerman's ban.

Banned under Commissioner Landis 

Landis banned a total of nineteen people during his tenure, more than all of his successors combined. Of the nineteen, two were re-instated by Landis, one was re-instated by a successor and sixteen remain banned. As a condition of accepting the Commissioner's post, Landis demanded and got nearly unlimited power to sanction every person employed in the major leagues, from owners to batboys. In practice, Landis only meted out punishment for serious off-field transgressions he believed were a threat to the image and/or integrity of the game. Disciplinary action for the on-field behavior of players, coaches and managers remained the responsibility of the respective league presidents, as it had been prior to the creation of the Commissioner's office.

 Eight players from the Chicago White Sox were banned in 1921 for conspiring with gamblers to throw the 1919 World Series in the Black Sox scandal:
Eddie Cicotte. One story says that Cicotte had been promised a $10,000 bonus – equal to $ today – if he won 30 games; he was denied five starts towards the end of the season by team owner Charles Comiskey, who had manager Kid Gleason bench him to "save his arm for the World Series". However, the story remains unsubstantiated. Cicotte went 29–7 for the season.
Lefty Williams lost all three of his starts in the World Series, setting a record that has never been matched.
Chick Gandil was the mastermind and ringleader of the scandal. In a 1956 article in Sports Illustrated, he admitted his role in the fix and expressed remorse for having done so, saying that he and his co-conspirators deserved to be thrown out of baseball just for talking to the gamblers.
Fred McMullin was only a backup infielder. However, he overheard teammates discussing the fix and threatened to report them unless he was included.
Swede Risberg was one of the ringleaders of the scandal.
Happy Felsch hit and fielded poorly in the series.
"Shoeless" Joe Jackson. (The precise extent of Jackson's involvement is controversial.)
Buck Weaver, like Jackson, was controversially banned. Weaver refused to accept any money and played to the best of his ability in the Series, but was banned nevertheless because he knew of the conspiracy but did not report it to MLB authorities and team ownership. Weaver successfully sued White Sox owner Charles Comiskey for his 1921 salary.
Joe Gedeon of the St. Louis Browns was banned in 1921 for allegedly conspiring with the gamblers behind the Black Sox scandal.
Eugene Paulette of the Philadelphia Phillies was banned in 1921 for associating with known gamblers.
Benny Kauff of the New York Giants was banned in 1921 for selling stolen cars. Commissioner Landis considered him "no longer a fit companion for other ball players", despite Kauff being acquitted of the charges against him in court.
Lee Magee of the Chicago Cubs was released just before the season began. Magee sued the Cubs for his 1920 salary and lost; after court testimony proved he had been involved in throwing games and collecting on bets, Landis banned him for life in 1921.
 Heinie Groh of the Cincinnati Reds was banned for two days in 1921 while he held out for a higher salary, and Landis gave Groh an ultimatum: play for the Reds in 1921, or face lifetime banishment. Groh chose the former option and played out the 1921 season; he retired in 1927.
 Ray Fisher of the Cincinnati Reds was banned in 1921 after he left his contract with the Reds to accept a coaching position at the University of Michigan before the start of the MLB season. Fisher believed his status would be voluntarily retired, but he later learned he had been declared ineligible. When Fisher appealed to Commissioner Landis, Landis banned him for violation of his contract. Fisher was reinstated by Commissioner Bowie Kuhn in 1980; he died in 1982.
 Dickie Kerr of the Chicago White Sox was banned from organized baseball in 1922 for violating the reserve clause in his contract. During the aforementioned 1919 Series Kerr, as one of the "Clean Sox" with no knowledge of the fix, had won both of his starts. Kerr was reinstated in 1925.
Phil Douglas of the New York Giants was banned in 1922 after notifying an acquaintance on the St. Louis Cardinals that he planned to jump the Giants for the pennant stretch run to spite McGraw, with whom Douglas had had a severe falling out during the regular season.
Jimmy O'Connell of the New York Giants and Giants coach Cozy Dolan were banned in 1924 for offering Philadelphia Phillies shortstop Heinie Sand $500 (equal to $ today) to throw a game between the two teams for the financial gain of O'Connell himself and his gambler backers.
William D. Cox, Philadelphia Phillies owner, was banned in 1943 for betting on his team's games. Cox and one of the predecessor Phillies owners, Horace Fogel, are the only owners to be banned for life.

Banned under Commissioner Kuhn 
After Landis died in 1944, there was a long lull before the next banishment. During the tenures of Commissioners Happy Chandler (1945–1951), Ford Frick (1951–1965), Spike Eckert (1965–1968), Bowie Kuhn (1969–1984) and Peter Ueberroth (1984–1989), only three players (or former players) were banned for life.

All three were banned by Kuhn, and all three were later reinstated. By the time of Kuhn's tenure, players had organized the Major League Baseball Players Association and negotiated the first Basic Agreement with the owners. Among other things the Agreement provided, for the first time, an independent process through which active players could appeal disciplinary decisions (up to and including lifetime bans) by League presidents or the Commissioner.

Jenkins missed the rest of the 1980 season, but was reinstated by an independent arbiter, and retired following the 1983 season. He was elected to the Hall of Fame in 1991.
 Willie Mays and Mickey Mantle, both retired and both in no way involved in baseball anymore, were banned in 1980 and 1983 respectively after they were hired by casinos in Atlantic City, New Jersey, as greeters and autograph signers. The bans were very controversial, especially since the casinos involved did not offer sports betting, which at the time was illegal in New Jersey. Nevertheless, Kuhn opined that a casino was "no place for a baseball hero and Hall of Famer." The bans took place prior to the Hall formalizing its policy against inducting banned persons, and the Hall took no action as a result of Kuhn's decision. Mantle and Mays were reinstated by Peter Ueberroth in 1985, and Mantle died in 1995.

Banned under Commissioner Giamatti 
A. Bartlett Giamatti served only five months as Commissioner of Baseball before he died of a heart attack on September 1, 1989.

Pete Rose, manager of the Cincinnati Reds and MLB's all-time leader in base hits, was investigated by lawyer John M. Dowd in 1989 for his alleged ties to gamblers and illegal bookmakers; when new information on Rose's gambling habits (including, among other things, betting on but not against the Reds) came to light, Giamatti and Rose reached a legal settlement that resulted in Rose's placement on the ineligible list on August 24, 1989. 
Whereas all other banned MLB personnel were involuntarily rendered ineligible pursuant to a unilateral decision by the Commissioner, Rose is the only person to be placed on the MLB ineligible list as a result of a mutual agreement. As part of their agreement, Rose accepted that there was a factual reason for his banishment. In return, Giamatti agreed that MLB would not make a formal finding of guilt or innocence with respect to the allegations against Rose. In addition, Rose is permitted to apply for reinstatement once a year indefinitely. Notwithstanding their agreement, the Commissioner stated in his press conference that "I have concluded that (Rose) bet on baseball" and described his sanction as "banishment for life" and "lifetime ineligibility," although he also made clear he was open to the possibility of re-instatement provided Rose could provide evidence of a "redirected, reconfigured, rehabilitated life." Giamatti died eight days later – his sudden demise immediately following Rose's banishment has been seen by some, including Rose himself, as an impediment to re-instatement. After years of denial, Rose admitted to betting on baseball (and on the Reds) in early 2004. He later acknowledged that "everything" the Dowd Report contained was the complete, unadulterated truth. Since admitting to his gambling infractions, Rose has maintained that he never bet against the Reds, never avoided betting on a particular starting pitcher and never bet on baseball until after he retired as a player – assertions that Dowd has disputed. No credible evidence has emerged to suggest Rose bet against his own team or systematically avoided betting on any pitchers in his starting rotations; however, some evidence has come to light suggesting Rose started betting on baseball while still a player-manager in Cincinnati. Rose has applied for reinstatement four times, all of which have been either ignored or denied, in large part due to Rose's acknowledgement that he continues to (legally) bet on baseball. Current commissioner Rob Manfred rejected his most recent request specifically citing his continued betting, saying that it was evidence that allowing his return would be "an unacceptable risk" to baseball.

Banned under Commissioner Vincent 
Fay Vincent became commissioner upon the death of Giamatti.

 George Steinbrenner, New York Yankees owner, was banned in 1990 for bribing a private investigator $40,000 to "dig up dirt" on Yankees player Dave Winfield in order to discredit him; much of the information Steinbrenner received was from small-time gambler and rackets-runner Howard Spira, who had once worked for Winfield's charitable foundation. In Steinbrenner's absence, Robert Nederlander, a limited partner, took control of the Yankees, and Joe Molloy, Steinbrenner's son-in-law, took control after Nederlander resigned. Molloy relinquished the team back to Steinbrenner when Bud Selig reinstated him in 1993; Steinbrenner retired as owner in 2006, passing control to his sons permanently, and died in 2010.
 Steve Howe of the New York Yankees was banned in 1992 after receiving seven suspensions related to drug use, particularly cocaine and alcohol. An independent arbiter reinstated Howe shortly after; Howe retired in 1996 and died in 2006.

Banned under Commissioner Selig 
Bud Selig became Commissioner after Fay Vincent's resignation; he was Acting Commissioner between 1992 and 1998, and was elected to the Office of Commissioner in 1998. In 1999, Selig oversaw the disbandment of the American and National League offices and took over all but a few ceremonial duties formerly performed by the League Presidents, including the discipline of personnel for on-field behavior. 

 Cincinnati Reds owner Marge Schott was banned in 1996 for bringing Major League Baseball into disrepute by repeatedly making slurs against African-Americans, Jews, Asians and homosexuals. Schott had previously been fined $25,000, and banned from day-to-day operations of the Reds for the 1993 season for similar offending. She was the first, and to date only, woman to be banned; she was reinstated in 1998, sold a majority stake in her franchise in 1999 and died in 2004.

Banned under Commissioner Manfred 
Rob Manfred succeeded Bud Selig as the Commissioner of Baseball after Selig's retirement on January 25, 2015.  To date, he has banned more people than his three immediate predecessors combined, and is second only to Landis for most people placed on the permanent ineligibility list. 

Jenrry Mejía, New York Mets pitcher, was banned on February 12, 2016, for testing positive for performance-enhancing drugs three times in less than a year. He sought and was granted reinstatement in July 2018, and was allowed to join the Dominican Summer League Mets in August. Subject to conditions set by Manfred, all restrictions were lifted at the beginning of spring training in 2019, by which point Mejía had been released by the Mets and signed to a minor league contract with the Boston Red Sox.
Chris Correa, former St. Louis Cardinals scouting director, was permanently banned on January 30, 2017 for his role in hacking the Houston Astros' scouting database to provide the Cardinals with a competitive edge in scouting. The Cardinals were also ordered to pay the Astros $2 million in restitution, and forfeited their top two picks in the 2017 draft to the Astros. Correa was later sentenced to 46 months in prison for unauthorized access of a protected computer, thus becoming the first person to be incarcerated for activities that resulted in a ban from the game.
John Coppolella, former Atlanta Braves general manager, was permanently banned on November 21, 2017 for his role in the Braves' circumvention of MLB rules regarding the signing of international free agents. The Braves were also required to release 12 prospects signed as international free agents, most notably Kevin Maitán, and MLB voided the contract of Ji-hwan Bae. Coppolella was reinstated in January 2023.
Brandon Taubman, former Houston Astros assistant general manager, was added to the list on November 15, 2019 for his inappropriate comments toward female reporters in the Astros clubhouse in October 2019, pending further investigation into sign stealing by the Astros during the 2017 and 2018 seasons. On January 13, 2020, following an investigation into sign stealing by the Astros, Manfred announced that Taubman would remain on the ineligible list through at least the end of the 2020 season. Although Taubman was interviewed for the sign stealing investigation, Manfred said that his clubhouse comments were egregious enough to merit significant discipline. Taubman was eligible to apply for reinstatement after the 2020 World Series, though there is no record of him doing so as of the start of the 2021 season. If he is reinstated, he will be permanently banned if he commits another "material violation" of baseball rules. 
Roberto Alomar, who was inducted into the Baseball Hall of Fame in 2011 as a player, was banned on April 30, 2021 following an independent investigation into claims he had harassed a female Toronto Blue Jays staffer in 2014. The Blue Jays subsequently announced they would remove a banner honoring Alomar from the Rogers Centre and sever all ties with him. However, he will remain enshrined in the Hall of Fame.
Mickey Callaway, former pitching coach of the Los Angeles Angels, was banned on May 26, 2021 following an investigation of allegations of sexual harassment spanning much of his career as manager of the New York Mets, pitching coach of the Cleveland Indians, and Angels pitching coach. The investigation started when The Athletic released an article that detailed the allegations. Callaway will not be eligible to apply for reinstatement until the end of the 2022 season.

See also 

 List of Major League Baseball players suspended for performance-enhancing drugs
 List of people banned or suspended by the NBA

References

External links
 Baseball Rules Menu on Baseball Almanac
 Baseball Steroid Suspensions
 Major League Baseball's "permanently ineligible" list

Banned for life
Figures that have been banned for life